Rene Fernandez (1 January 1906 – 1956) was a Bolivian football forward.

Career 
During his career he has made two appearances for the Bolivia national team at the 1930 FIFA World Cup.

References

External links

 

1906 births
1956 deaths
Association football forwards
Bolivian footballers
Bolivia international footballers
1930 FIFA World Cup players